Minut sa njom (trans. A Minute with Her) is the eighteenth studio album from Serbian and former Yugoslav rock band Riblja Čorba.

The album features mostly love songs, and is the first Riblja Čorba album since their 1981 album Pokvarena mašta i prljave strasti which does not feature any song with political-related lyrics.

Album cover
The album cover was designed by Jugoslav and Jakša Vlahović.

Track listing

Personnel
Bora Đorđević - vocals
Vidoja Božinović - guitar
Miša Aleksić - bass guitar
Vicko Milatović - drums
Nikola Zorić - keyboards

Additional personnel
Đorđe David - backing vocals (on "Krilati pegazi")
Milan Popović - producer
Goran Šimpraga - engineer
Bojana Tomašević - engineer
Nenad Dragićević - technician

References

External links
Minut sa njom at Discogs

Riblja Čorba albums
2009 albums